The Mortzenhaus was one of the largest and most well known city palaces in Hamburg. It was built in 1621 by the brothers and arms dealers Jacob and Hans Moers, who were among the wealthiest people in Hamburg in their lifetime.

History

Overview
Built as a palace in renaissance style and occupying the addresses Alter Wandrahm 19–23, it was markedly different from most other buildings in Hamburg.

The Mortzenhaus was demolished in 1886 as part of the construction of the Speicherstadt.

Owners
 Johann Hinrich Gossler
 Johann Heinrich Gossler
 Wilhelm Gossler

References

Buildings and structures in Hamburg-Mitte
History of Hamburg
Hamburg Mortzenhaus
Hamburg Mortzenhaus
Hamburg Mortzenhaus
1621 establishments in the Holy Roman Empire